Ewart Gladstone Culpin (3 December 1877 – 1 December 1946) was a British Labour Party politician and town planner who served as the Chairman of London County Council.

Biography
The son of Ben Ephraim Lamartine and Eliza Culpin, Ewart attended Alleynes Grammar School and Hitchin Grammar School. He became a journalist, based in Letchworth, where he developed an interest in town planning and the garden city movement.  In 1906, he was appointed as secretary of the Garden City Association, and in 1907 he founded the International Garden Cities and Town Planning Association.  Enthusiastic about the positions, in his spare time he qualified as a town planner and as an architect. Through the association, he promoted low-density housing schemes, whether designed as new towns or as extensions to existing ones, and in 1913 he toured the United States speaking on this topic.  His approach was opposed by Ebenezer Howard, founder of the movement, and in 1918 he was replaced by Charles Purdom, who, like Howard, championed only new town developments.

After World War I, Culpin was president of the Belgian Society for the Reconstruction of Belgium, and he chaired the Standing Conference on London Regional Planning from 1926 until his death. In 1930, he was the president of the Incorporated Association of Architects and Surveyors, while in 1937/8 he was president of the Town Planning Institute.  He also became a Fellow of the Royal Institute of British Architects.

Culpin became active in the Labour Party, for which he stood unsuccessfully in Islington North at the 1924 United Kingdom general election.  In 1925, he was appointed to London County Council as an alderman, serving until 1937, when he moved to become a councillor in Battersea North.  He chaired the council from 1938 to 1939.

Culpin received several honours, including becoming an officer of the Belgian Order of the Crown, a grand officer of the Romanian Order of the Crown, and a commander of the Dahomean Order of the Black Star.

References

1877 births
1946 deaths
English urban planners
Labour Party (UK) councillors
Fellows of the Royal Institute of British Architects
Officers of the Order of the Crown (Belgium)
Grand Officers of the Order of the Crown (Romania)
Members of London County Council
People educated at Hitchin Boys' School
People from Letchworth
Presidents of the Royal Town Planning Institute